Dabao may refer to:

Da Bao, a large Chinese steamed bun

Places
Dabao, Hebei, a town in Zhuolu County, Hebei
Dabao, Gansu, a town in Kang County, Gansu
Dabao, Sichuan, a town in Ebian Yi Autonomous County, Sichuan

Historical eras
Dabao (550–551), era name used by Emperor Jianwen of Liang
Dabao (958–971), era name used by Liu Chang (Southern Han)